Renée Marie Bumb (born January 25, 1960) is the Chief United States district judge of the United States District Court for the District of New Jersey.

Early life and education
Born in Bellevue, Ohio, Bumb graduated from Ohio State University with her Bachelor of Arts degree in 1981 and later from the University of Chicago where she earned her Master of Arts degree in 1983. Bumb attended Rutgers School of Law–Newark and graduated with a Juris Doctor in 1987.

Legal career
Bumb was a law clerk for Judge Garrett E. Brown, Jr. with the United States District Court for the District of New Jersey from 1987 to 1988. She was in private practice in New Jersey from 1988 to 1991. She was an Assistant United States Attorney of the District of New Jersey from 1991 to 2006.

Federal judicial career
In 2006, Bumb was nominated to the United States District Court for the District of New Jersey by President George W. Bush on January 25, 2006, to a seat vacated by William H. Walls. Bumb was confirmed by the United States Senate on June 6, 2006, by a 89–0 vote. She received her commission on June 12, 2006. She became Chief Judge on February 1, 2023, after the retirement of Freda L. Wolfson.

References

Sources

Living people
Assistant United States Attorneys
Judges of the United States District Court for the District of New Jersey
Ohio State University alumni
People from Bellevue, Ohio
Rutgers School of Law–Newark alumni
Rutgers University alumni
United States district court judges appointed by George W. Bush
21st-century American judges
University of Chicago alumni
21st-century American women judges
1960 births